Joseph John Brovia (February 18, 1922 – August 15, 1994) was an American professional baseball player. An outfielder, Brovia played almost 1,800 games over 15 seasons in minor league baseball but only 21 games as a pinch hitter at the Major League level with the 1955 Cincinnati Redlegs.

He graduated from Santa Cruz High School in 1940.

Brovia was a longtime star outfielder in the Pacific Coast League with the San Francisco Seals, Portland Beavers, Sacramento Solons, and the Oakland Oaks from 1941–42 and from 1946–55. He served in the United States Army during World War II and missed the 1943–45 seasons.

Known best for his batting, Brovia had a lifetime .311 average in 1,805 minor league games (.304 lifetime in the PCL) producing 1,846 hits, 1,144 RBIs and 214 home runs. As a prolific hitter, Brovia was popular with the fans, especially for his home runs over the four-story high fence at Seals Stadium, called the "Green Monster" of the Coast League.

He had a short stint at age 33 with the  Redlegs, but only batted as a pinch hitter. In 21 games and plate appearances, he collected two singles and one base on balls, and drove in four runs.

After his shot with the Redlegs, he played the next season in Mexico, after which he retired.

Brovia died from cancer in Santa Cruz, California. He was inducted posthumously into the Pacific Coast League Hall of Fame in 2005.

References

 
Dennis Snelling: The Pacific Coast League: A Statistical History, 1903-1957, McFarland & Company, Jefferson N.C., 1995

Further reading
Dennis Snelling: A Glimpse of Fame, McFarland & Company, Jefferson N.C., 1993, pp. 89–102
Dennis Snelling: The Greatest Minor League: A History of the Pacific Coast League, McFarland & Company, Jefferson N.C., 2012.

External links

1922 births
1994 deaths
American expatriate baseball players in Mexico
American people of Italian descent
Baseball players from California
Buffalo Bisons (minor league) players
Deaths from cancer in California
Cincinnati Redlegs players
El Paso Texans players
Oakland Oaks (baseball) players
People from Santa Cruz County, California
Portland Beavers players
Rojos del Águila de Veracruz players
Sacramento Solons players
Salt Lake City Bees players
San Francisco Seals (baseball) players
San Jose JoSox players
Tacoma Tigers players
United States Army personnel of World War II
Santa Cruz High School alumni